NIES is an initialism, which may refer to:

Newly industrializing economies:
 Four Asian Tigers
 Newly industrialized country

Various organizations:
 National Institute for Environmental Studies, Japan
 Northern Ireland Electricity Service
 Nanjing Institute of Environmental Sciences, China
 National Industry Extension Service, Australia

Various tools or systems:
 National Imagery Exploitation System, of the National Geospatial-Intelligence Agency, United States Department of Defense

Various academic studies:
 Nauru Island Effect Study, carried out by the[United States Department of Energy from September 2002 to June 2003 to study the island's influence on atmospheric radiation measurement (ARM) at a measurement site located on Nauru.

See also
Nies (surname)